Facundo Julián Espíndola (26 December 1992 – 22 July 2018) was an Argentine footballer.

Death
On 22 July 2018, Espíndola was attacked after leaving a bar in Hurlingham, Buenos Aires, and died from his injuries. Fellow footballer Nahuel Oviedo was arrested in connection with his death. Oviedo was sentenced to 14 years in prison in February 2020, while Ever Brizuela Cáceres, who was considered to be a participant in the attack, was sentenced to 12 years.

Career statistics

References

1992 births
2018 deaths
Argentine footballers
Association football goalkeepers
Primera B Metropolitana players
Chacarita Juniors footballers
Club Atlético River Plate footballers
Club Atlético Lanús footballers
Club Almagro players
Defensores de Belgrano de Villa Ramallo players
Atlético Uruguay players
Argentine murder victims
Male murder victims
People murdered in Argentina
Sportspeople from Buenos Aires Province